Cross Street Baptist Church is on Cross Street in Arnold, Nottinghamshire.

History
The original Baptist chapel on this site was built in 1825 by the George Street Particular Baptist Church. It was sold in the middle of the nineteenth century to the Scotch Baptists of Park Street.

The current building was erected to designs by the architect William Herbert Higginbottom, and opened on 18 February 1909.

References

Churches in Nottingham
Baptist churches in Nottinghamshire
Churches completed in 1909